Insulin receptor substrate (IRS) is an important ligand in the insulin response of human cells.

IRS-1, for example, is an IRS protein that contains a phosphotyrosine binding-domain (PTB-domain). In addition, the insulin receptor contains a NPXY motif. The PTB-domain binds the NPXY sequence. Thus, the insulin receptor binds IRS.

Genes
  (see also Insulin receptor substrate 1)
  (see also Insulin receptor substrate 2)
  - a pseudogene

References
 

Coordination chemistry
Proteins